Artificial intelligence (AI) in hiring involves the use of technology to automate aspects of the hiring process. Advances in artificial intelligence, such as the advent of machine learning and the growth of big data, enable AI to be utilized to recruit, screen, and predict the success of applicants. Proponents of artificial intelligence in hiring claim it reduces bias, assists with finding qualified candidates, and frees up human resource workers' time for other tasks, while opponents worry that AI perpetuates inequalities in the workplace and will eliminate jobs.

Background 
Artificial intelligence has been a fascination of researchers since the term was coined in the mid-1950s. Researchers have identified four main forms of intelligence that AI would need to possess to truly replace humans in the workplace: mechanical, analytical, intuitive, and empathetic. Automation follows a predictable progression in which it will first be able to replace the mechanical tasks, then analytical tasks, then intuitive tasks, and finally empathy based tasks. However, full automation is not the only potential outcome of AI advancements. Humans may instead work alongside machines, enhancing the effectiveness of both. In the hiring context, this means that AI has already replaced many basic human resource tasks in recruitment and screening, while freeing up time for human resource workers to do other more creative tasks that can not yet be automated or do not make fiscal sense to automate. It also means that the type of jobs companies are recruiting and hiring form will continue to shift as the skillsets that are most valuable change.

Human resources has been identified as one of the ten industries most affected by AI. It is increasingly common for companies to use AI to automate aspects of their hiring process. The hospitality, finance, and tech industries in particular have incorporated AI into their hiring processes to significant extents.

Human resources is fundamentally an industry based around making predictions. Human resource specialists must predict which people would make quality candidates for a job, which marketing strategies would get those people to apply, which applicants would make the best employees, what kinds of compensation would get them to accept an offer, what is needed to retain an employee, which employees should be promoted, what a companies staffing needs, among others. AI is particularly adept at prediction because it can analyze huge amounts of data. This enables AI to make insights many humans would miss and find connections between seemingly unrelated data points. This provides value to a company and has made it advantageous to use AI to automate or augment many human resource tasks.

Uses

Screeners 
Screeners are tests that allow companies to sift through a large applicant pool and extract applicants that have desirable features. Companies commonly screen through the use of questionnaires, coding tests, interviews, and resume analysis. Artificial Intelligence already plays a major role in the screening process. Resumes can be analyzed using AI for desirable characteristics, such as a certain amount of work experience or a relevant degree. Interviews can then be extended to applicant's whose resumes contain these characteristics.

What factors are used to screen applicants is a concern to ethicists and civil rights activists. A screener that favors people who have similar characteristics to those already employed at a company may perpetuate inequalities. For example, if a company that is predominantly white and male uses its employees' data to train its screener it may accidentally create a screening process that favors white, male applicants. The automation of screeners also has the potential to reduce biases. Biases against applicants with African American sounding names have been shown in multiple studies. An AI screener has the potential to limit human bias and error in the hiring process, allowing more minority applicants to be successful.

Recruitment 
Recruitment involves the identification of potential applicants and the marketing of positions. AI is commonly utilized in the recruitment process because it can help boost the number of qualified applicants for positions.  Companies are able to use AI to target their marketing to applicants who are likely to be good fits for a position. This often involves the use of social media sites advertising tools, which rely on AI. Facebook allows advertisers to target ads based on demographics, location, interests, behavior, and connections. Facebook also allows companies to target a "look-a-like" audience, that is the company supplies Facebook with a data set, typically the company's current employees, and Facebook will target the ad to profiles that are similar to the profiles in the data set. Additionally, job sites like Indeed, Glassdoor, and ZipRecruiter target job listings to applicants that have certain characteristics employers are looking for. Targeted advertising has many advantages for companies trying to recruit such being a more efficient use of resources, reaching a desired audience, and boosting qualified applicants. This has helped make it a mainstay in modern hiring.

Who receives a targeted ad can be controversial. In hiring, the implications of targeted ads have to do with who is able to find out about and then apply to a position. Most targeted ad algorithms are proprietary information. Some platforms, like Facebook and Google, allow users to see why they were shown a specific ad, but users who do not receive the ad likely never know of its existence and also have no way of knowing why they were not shown the ad.

Interviews 
Chatbots were one of the first applications of AI and are commonly used in the hiring process. Interviewees interact with chatbots to answer interview questions. Their responses can then be analyzed by AI, providing prospective employers with a myriad of insights. Chatbots streamline the interview process and reduces human resource workers' labor. Video interviews utilize AII and have become prevalent. Zappyhire, a recruitment automation startup has developed a recruitment bot, that assures that you engage with the most relevant candidates by using chatbot's AI-powered resume screening technology. HireVue, a leader in the space, has created technology that analyzes interviewees responses and gestures during recorded video interviews. Over 12 million interviewees have been screened by the over 700 companies that utilize the service.

Controversies 
Artificial intelligence in hiring confers many benefits, but it also has some challenges which have concerned experts. AI is only as good as the data it is using. Biases can inadvertently be baked into the data used in AI. Often companies will use data from their employees to decide what people to recruit or hire. This can perpetuate bias and lead to more homogenous workforces. Facebook Ads was an example of a platform that created such controversy for allowing business owners to specify what type of employee they are looking for. For example, job advertisements for nursing and teach could be set such that only women of a specific age group would see the advertisements. Facebook Ads has since then removed this function from its platform, citing the potential problems with the function in perpetuating biases and stereotypes against minorities.

It can also be hard to quantify what makes a good employee. This poses a challenge for training AI to predict which employees will be best. Commonly used metrics like performance reviews can be subjective and have been shown to favor white employees over black employees and men over women.  Another challenge is the limited amount of available data. Employers only collect certain details about candidates during the initial stages of the hiring process. This requires AI to make determinations about candidates with very limited information to go off of. Additionally, many employers do not hire employees frequently and so have limited firm specific data to go off. To combat this, many firms will use algorithms and data from other firms in their industry. AI's reliance on applicant and current employees personal data raises privacy issues. These issues effect both the applicants and current employees, but also may have implications for third parties who are linked through social media to applicants or current employees. For example, a sweep of someone's social media will also show their friends and people they have tagged in photos or posts.

AI makes it easier for companies to search applicants social media accounts. A study conducted by Monash University found that 45% of hiring managers use social media to gain insight on applicants. Seventy percent of those surveyed said they had rejected an applicant because of things discovered on their applicant's social media, yet only 17% of hiring managers saw using social media in the hiring process as a violation of applicants privacy. Using social media in the hiring process is appealing to hiring managers because it offers them a less curated view of applicants lives. The privacy trade-off is significant. Social media profiles often reveal information about applicants that human resource departments are legally not allowed to require applicants to divulge like race, ability status, and sexual orientation.

AI and the future of hiring 
AI is changing the way work is done. Artificial intelligence along with other technological advances such as improvements in robotics have placed 47% of jobs at risk of being eliminated in the near future. Some classify the shifts in labor brought about by AI as a 4th industrial revolution, which they call Industrial Revolution 4.0. According to some scholars, however, the transformative impact of AI on labor has been overstated. The "no-real-change" theory holds that an IT revolution has already occurred, but that the benefits of implementing new technologies does not outweigh the costs associated with adopting them. This theory claims that the result of the IT revolution is thus much less impactful than had originally been forecasted. Other scholars refute this theory claiming that AI has already led to significant job loss for unskilled labor and that it will eliminate middle skill and high skill jobs in the future. This position is based around the idea that AI is not yet a technology of general use and that any potential 4th industrial revolution has not fully occurred. A third theory holds that the effect of AI and other technological advances is too complicated to yet be understood. This theory is centered around the idea that while AI will likely eliminate jobs in the short term it will also likely increase the demand for other jobs. The question then becomes will the new jobs be accessible to people and will they emerge near when jobs are eliminated.

Although robots can replace people to complete some tasks, there are still many tasks that cannot be done alone by robots that master artificial intelligence. A study analyzed 2,000 work tasks in 800 different occupations globally, and concluded that half (totaling US$ 15 trillion in salaries) could be automatized by adapting already existing technologies. Less than 5% of occupations could be fully automated and 60% have at least 30% automatable tasks.  In other words, in most cases, artificial intelligence is a tool rather than a substitute for labor. As artificial intelligence enters the field of human work, people have gradually discovered that artificial intelligence is incapable of unique tasks, and the advantage of human beings is to understand uniqueness and use tools rationally. At this time, human-machine reciprocal work came into being. Brandão discovers that people can form organic partnerships with machines. “Humans enable machines to do what they do best: doing repetitive tasks, analyzing significant volumes of data, and dealing with routine cases. Due to reciprocity, machines enable humans to have their potentialities "strengthened" for tasks such as resolving ambiguous information, exercising the judgment of difficult cases, and contacting dissatisfied clients.” Daugherty and Wilson have observed successful new types of human-computer interaction in occupations and tasks in various fields. In other words, even in activities and capabilities that are considered simpler, new technologies will not pose an imminent danger to workers. As far as General Electric is concerned, buyers of it and its equipment will always need maintenance workers. Entrepreneurs need these workers to work well with new systems that can integrate their skills with advanced technologies in novel ways. 

Artificial intelligence has sped up the hiring process considerably, dramatically reducing costs. For example, Unilever has reviewed over 250,000 applications using AI and reduced its hiring process from 4 months to 4 weeks. This saved the company 50,000 hours of labor. The increased efficiency AI promises has sped up its adoption by human resource departments globally.

Regulations on AI in hiring 
The Artificial Intelligence Video Interview Act, effective in Illinois since 2020, regulates the use of AI to analyze and evaluate job applicants’ video interviews.

References

Applications of artificial intelligence
Machine learning
Automation
Recruitment software